Gerald Francis "Jerry" Gaus (1952 – 19 August 2020) was an American philosopher and the founding editor of the academic journal Politics, Philosophy & Economics. His last academic post was as the James E. Rogers Professor of Philosophy at the University of Arizona. His books include Public Reason and Diversity: Reinterpretations of Liberalism (2022), The Open Society and Its Complexities (2021), The Tyranny of the Ideal: Justice in a Diverse Society (2016), The Order of Public Reason (2011), On Philosophy, Politics, and Economics (2008), Contemporary Theories of Liberalism (2003), Political Concepts and Political Theories (2000), Justificatory Liberalism (1996), Value and Justification: The Foundations of Liberal Theory (1990), and The Modern Liberal Theory of Man (1983).

Summing up his views on the modern state of ethical discussion in terms of present philosophy, Gaus remarked,

The Tyranny of the Ideal 
His 2016 book The Tyranny of the Ideal: Justice in a Diverse Society is a critical treatise about ethical idealism in the context of heterogeneous modern cultures. Gaus argues that an overriding emphasis on ideal social states causes individuals to wish for impossible political perfection and thus lose their sense of what constitutes practical policy advocacy as well as logical choices during elections. Gaus gives other warnings such as that people can lose their sense of how much has already been achieved and how well current situations have become in certain circumstances. In general, Gaus advocates for compromise and incremental socio-political reform.

Praise for the book appeared from scholarly publications such as Perspectives on Politics. Interest also appeared in the popular media, an example being the Vox.com news website.

Publications

Books

See also 

 American philosophy
 List of American philosophers
 List of University of Arizona people

References

External links 
 

1952 births
2020 deaths
20th-century American philosophers
21st-century American philosophers
American ethicists
American political philosophers
Philosophers from Arizona
University of Arizona faculty